Muamar Karakra (born 29 March 1991) is an Arab-Israeli footballer.

Club career
Karakra grew up in the youth ranks of Ahva Arraba and made his debut for the senior side in 2010, while the club was playing in Liga Leumit. He stayed with the club until 2014, as the club rejected offers for him from clubs such as Bnei Sakhnin and Ironi Tiberias.

At the beginning of the 2014–15 season Karakra moved to play in Hapoel Beit She'an. In December 2014 Karkara signed with Hapoel Umm al-Fahm, from Liga Bet, but eventually transferred to Maccabi Tzur Shalom.

During 2015–16 Karakra played for Maccabi Ironi Kiryat Ata and Maccabi Sektzia Ma'alot-Tarshiha. At the beginning of the following season, Karakra signed with Ironi Tiberias.

References

External links
 

1991 births
Living people
Arab citizens of Israel
Arab-Israeli footballers
Israeli footballers
Association football forwards
Ahva Arraba F.C. players
Hapoel Beit She'an F.C. players
Maccabi Tzur Shalom F.C. players
Maccabi Ironi Kiryat Ata F.C. players
Maccabi Sektzia Ma'alot Tarshiha F.C. players
Ironi Tiberias F.C. players
Hapoel Iksal F.C. players
Hapoel Umm al-Fahm F.C. players
Liga Leumit players
People from Arraba, Israel